The fifteenth season of Unsolved Mysteries is a Netflix reboot revival of the long-running American television series, created by John Cosgrove and Terry Dunn Meurer. The show, which documents and seeks to solve cold cases and paranormal phenomena, originally ran from 1987–2010. 

Unlike all previous seasons, there is no host or narrator in the Netflix reboot. However, an image of longtime host Robert Stack is shown in the title sequence of each episode.

Background
In 2017, the film and television distribution company FilmRise acquired worldwide digital distribution rights to the original run of Unsolved Mysteries. The company announced its intention to release updated versions of the show's episodes through multiple streaming platforms. This led to renewed interest in the series, with original creators, John Cosgrove and Terry Dunn Meurer, expressing interest in reviving the show. On January 18, 2019, Netflix announced that it had picked up a 12-part reboot of the series. It was further revealed that Stranger Things executive producer Shawn Levy and his company 21 Laps Entertainment, along with Cosgrove-Meurer Productions (and Netflix) would be producing the new episodes. Original creators, Cosgrove and Meurer are expected to showrun the series, along with Levy and Josh Barry acting as executive producers. Robert Wise is expected to act as co-executive producer, along with showrunner Dunn Meurer. The reboot's format will depart from the original series' multiple mysteries showcase and will instead feature one case per episode. Cosgrove has stated that the reboot will be "pure documentary style" and there will be no host or narrator. The first six episodes are presented as Volume 1 on Netflix. Netflix announced on August 19, 2020 that the first season's six remaining episodes would air (as Volume 2) on October 19, 2020.

Episodes

Response
On review aggregator Rotten Tomatoes, the series holds an approval rating of 74% based on 23 reviews, with an average rating of 6.92/10. The website's critics consensus reads: "Unsolved Mysteries latest reboot is slick and features compelling cases, but fails to live up to the original's spookiness and gets lost in the current sea of true crime offerings." On Metacritic, it has a weighted average score of 57 out of 100, based on seven critics, indicating "mixed or average reviews".

The show began getting "credible tips" following the release of the new season. Viewers also began coming up with their own theories about the cases featured. In August 2020, it was reported that 13.7% of subscribers had watched the series over its first month.

References

External links
 
 
 

2020 American television seasons
Lists of American non-fiction television series episodes
Lists of mystery television series episodes